Whitney Hubbs (born 1977) is an American photographer, living in western New York. Her work is held in the collections of the J. Paul Getty Museum and UCR/California Museum of Photography.

Early life and education
Hubbs was born and raised in Los Angeles, California. She graduated with a degree in photography from California College of the Arts in 2005 and received an MFA from the University of Southern California in 2009.

Life and work
With the series Body Doubles, "she photographed women in various states of undress, their faces obscured by a variety of textured papers and fabrics in bold colors" "in poses that defy the conventional language of nude photography." "The series was her way of showering off the male gaze by looking at women through her own eyes."

Her book Say So (2021) contains self-portraits that could, in the words of Chris Wiley writing in frieze, "be superficially described as sadomasochistic erotica, since they feature Hubbs in a variety of compromising positions (bound and gagged, piss-covered, breasts plastered with glistening blobs of pink chewing gum) and in various states of undress." However, "when we plumb their depths, these pictures reveal themselves as being less about titillation and more about universal, close-to-the-bone emotional struggles, and Hubbs's attempt to overcome them."

Hubbs is a professor of photography at Alfred University in Western New York.

Publications
Woman In Motion. Los Angeles: Hesse, 2017. . 
Say So. London: Self Publish, Be Happy, 2021. . With an essay by Chris Kraus. Edition of 1000 copies.

Solo exhibitions
Whitney Hubbs, Situations, New York City, 2020

Collections
Hubbs' work is held in the following permanent collections:
J. Paul Getty Museum, Los Angeles, CA: 5 prints (as of 26 March 2022)
UCR/California Museum of Photography, College of Humanities, Arts, and Social Sciences at University of California, Riverside, CA: 1 print (as of 26 March 2022)

References

External links

Alfred University faculty
American women photographers
21st-century American photographers
Photographers from Los Angeles
University of California, Los Angeles alumni
California College of the Arts alumni
People from Los Angeles
Living people
1977 births